Johan Jakob Nervander (23 February 1805 – 15 March 1848)  was a Finnish poet, physicist and meteorologist.

He was born to Johan Nervander, a pharmacist in Uusikaupunki, and his wife Beata Bergbom. In 1820 Nervander became a student at the Royal Academy of Turku where he was a friend of Johan Ludvig Runeberg.

During the period 1832-1836 Nervander went on a long journey to central and southern Europe, by a scholarship for travelling awarded by the Royal Academy of Turku. During this journey he became interested in geomagnetism upon meeting Wilhelm Eduard Weber and Carl Friedrich Gauss in Göttingen on his travels in Central Europe.

From Stockholm he returned to Helsinki through Saint Petersburg. In Saint Petersburg he met the academician Adolph Theodor Kupffer the director of Saint Petersburg Academy of Sciences who supported Nervander's
idea to have a magnetic observatory established in Helsinki. The new, necessary houses were built in Kaisaniemi Park, Helsinki,
and Nervander was appointed the first director of the observatory. Starting from 1844, the Helsinki data series (1844-1912) is one of the oldest systematic geomagnetic observation series in the world.

In 1846 he was appointed professor in physics at the University of Helsinki succeeding Gustaf Gabriel Hällström. In 1848 he fell ill with smallpox and died in the same year. After Nervander's death Henrik Gustaf Borenius continued as director at the observatory.

References

External links
 

1805 births
1848 deaths
Demidov Prize laureates
Geophysicists
Academic staff of the University of Helsinki